Beat It Up may refer to:

Music
Beat It Up! album by The Kaisers

Songs
"Beat it Up", song by Gucci Mane from Burrrprint 2
"Beat It Up", song by hip hop duo Big Tymers featuring Tateeze from album Big Money Heavyweight
"Beat It Up", song by Keak da Sneak from Hi-Tek (album)
"Beat It Up", single by Bertell Merovingian Music Twista discography 2010
"Beat It Up", song by T. Mills featuring Juicy
"Beat It Up", song by Kane & Abel from Rise to Power (Kane & Abel album)
"Beat It Up", song by Bama Boyz from Meet the Bamaz (mixtape)
"Beat It Up", song by Slim Thug featuring Dallas Blocker
"Beat It Up", song by Bumpy Knuckles & Statik Selektah -Statik Selektah production discography  
"Make Her Say (Beat It Up)", song by Estelle from True Romance (Estelle album)
 "Whistle (Beat It Up)", song by Cakes da Killa
"Beat it Upright", song by Korn from Untouchables (album)

See also
 Beat Me Up (disambiguation)
 Beat You Up (disambiguation)